Sunday River may refer to:

 Sunday River (Osgood River tributary), Chaudière-Appalaches, Quebec, Canada
 Sunday River (Androscoggin River tributary), Oxford County, Maine, United States
 Sunday River (ski resort), one of Maine's largest ski resorts located near the confluence of the Sunday and Androscoggin rivers

See also
 Sundays River, Eastern Cape Province, South Africa
 Sunday Creek (disambiguation)